In 2017, there were 28 new This American Life episodes.

 air date: 2017-01-06

 air date: 2017-01-20

 air date: 2017-02-03

 air date: 2017-02-17

 air date: 2017-03-03

 air date: 2017-03-17

 air date: 2017-03-31

 air date: 2017-04-14

 air date: 2017-04-28

 air date: 2017-05-05

 air date: 2017-05-19

 air date: 2017-06-09

 air date: 2017-06-30

 air date: 2017-07-14

 air date: 2017-07-21

 air date: 2017-08-04

 air date: 2017-08-18

 air date: 2017-09-01

 air date: 2017-09-08

 air date: 2017-09-22

 air date: 2017-10.06

 air date: 2017-10-13

 air date: 2017-10-20

 air date: 2017-10-27

 air date: 2017-11-10

 air date: 2017-12-08

 air date: 2017-12-15

 air date: 2017–12-22

References

External links
This American Lifes radio archive for 2017

2017
This American Life
This American Life